Dole is a settlement in the Municipality of Šentjur, in eastern Slovenia. It lies on the road leading north from the town of Šentjur towards Dramlje. The settlement, and the entire municipality, are included in the Savinja Statistical Region, which is in the Slovenian portion of the historical Duchy of Styria.

History
Dole was formerly a hamlet of Trnovec pri Dramljah. It was administratively separated from that settlement and became a separate settlement in 1994.

References

External links
Dole at Geopedia

Populated places in the Municipality of Šentjur